American Matador is the second studio album by guitarist Marc Bonilla, released in 1993 through Reprise Records.

Track listing

Personnel

Marc Bonilla – vocals (track 7), guitar, keyboard, programming, bass, production
Glenn Hughes – vocals (track 4)
James DePrato – guitar (track 8)
Ronnie Montrose – slide guitar (track 12)
James Newton Howard – keyboard (track 1), piano (track 1), orchestration
Patrick Leonard – piano (tracks 4, 13)
Mike Keneally – organ
Toss Panos – drums (tracks 1, 3, 6), percussion (tracks 2, 7, 8, 12)
Troy Luccketta drums (tracks 2, 4, 5, 7, 8, 12, 13)
Lenny Castro – percussion (track 11)
Michael Scott – engineering, production
Jeff Hendrickson – mixing
Danny Alonso – engineering
Pete Magdaleno – engineering
Chris Danley – engineering
John Jackson – engineering
Judy Kirschner – engineering
Terry Reiff – engineering
Steve Hall – mastering
Pat Dorn – production coordination

References

Marc Bonilla albums
1993 albums
Reprise Records albums